Amund, is a Norse masculine given name. It derives from the Old Norse Agmundr, meaning respectful protector.

People named Amund
Amund is a given name. Notable people with the name include:

Amund B. Larsen (1849–1928), Norwegian linguist
Amund Dietzel (1891–1974), Norwegian-American tattoo artist
Amund Helland (1846–1918), Norwegian geologist, politician and non-fiction writer
Amund Rydland (1888–1967), Norwegian actor and theatre director
Amund Rasmussen Skarholt (1892–1956), Norwegian politician for the Labour Party
Amund Sjøbrend (born 1952), former ice speed skater from Norway
Amund Skiri (born 1978), Norwegian footballer currently playing for Aalesund
Amund Svensson (born 1978), Norwegian guitar player with The Kovenant
Lars Amund Vaage (born 1952), Norwegian author and playwright
Master Amund (Mäster Amund), Swedish 15th-century painter known for his paintings in Södra Råda Old Church

Places
Amund, Iowa, an unincorporated community, United States
Amund Ringnes Island, one of the Sverdrup Islands in Nunavut, Canada

See also
Amundson

Norwegian masculine given names